Lynette Jansen Van Vuuren is a road cyclist from South Africa. She represented her nation at the 2006 UCI Road World Championships.

References

External links
 profile at Procyclingstats.com

South African female cyclists
Living people
Place of birth missing (living people)
Date of birth missing (living people)
Year of birth missing (living people)